Jeffrey B. Rauch (born 29 November 1945, New York City) is an American mathematical physicist, specializing in partial differential equations.

Rauch obtained his bachelor's degree from Harvard University in 1967, and his Ph.D. from New York University in 1971 (with Peter Lax as advisor).

He is a fellow of the American Mathematical Society.

He is also an author of textbooks.

References

External links
Jeffrey Rauch's web page on University of Michigan web site

1945 births
Living people
Mathematical physicists
Harvard University alumni
Fellows of the American Mathematical Society
New York University alumni
Scientists from New York City
20th-century American mathematicians
American textbook writers
21st-century American mathematicians
PDE theorists
Mathematicians from New York (state)
University of Michigan faculty